Actinella carinofausta is a species of air-breathing land snail, a terrestrial pulmonate gastropod mollusk in the family Geomitridae. This species is endemic to Madeira, Portugal.

References

Molluscs of Madeira
Actinella
Gastropods described in 1983
Taxonomy articles created by Polbot